Rebecca Henderson (born 4 July 2001) is an Australian racewalking athlete. She qualified to represent Australia at the 2020 Summer Olympics in Tokyo, competing in the women's 20 kilometres walk. Henderson came 38th with a time of 1:38.21, 10 seconds behind her compatriot, Katie Henderson.

Early years 
Henderson joined the Berwick Little Athletics Centre at an early age. At the age of 10  she decided to give away the sprints and concentrate on the walks for her athletics career.

Henderson was always very bright at school and found it hard to juggle training with her studies. In 2019, she finished up dux of her school, Berwick College., In 2020 she began a Bachelor of Biomedical Science degree at Monash University.

Achievements 
Henderson came 16th over the 10 km distance in the 2018 World Race Walking Cup in China. In March 2021, she set PBs in 5 km and 10 km walks before making a 20 km debut in with a time of 1:32.12.

Henderson's personal best for the 20 km walk is 1hr:31.53 in Melbourne in May, 2021. This propelled her into the Australian All-time top-15 (13th).

Her PB for 10 km is 46m.34 which has her in the Australian top-30.

References

2001 births
Living people
Australian female racewalkers
Athletes (track and field) at the 2020 Summer Olympics
Olympic athletes of Australia
21st-century Australian women